Jonathan Javier Philippe (born 24 January 1988 in Navarro) is an Argentine professional association football striker.

He was signed in 2008 from the youth divisions of Boca Juniors and made his debut on August 31, 2008 in a 3-0 win over Huracán.

Honours

References

External links
  
 Jonathan Javier Philippe at BDFA 
 

1988 births
Living people
Argentine footballers
Argentine expatriate footballers
Argentine Primera División players
Association football forwards
Boca Juniors footballers
Expatriate footballers in El Salvador
Expatriate footballers in Paraguay
Expatriate footballers in Switzerland
Ferro Carril Oeste footballers
Sportspeople from Buenos Aires Province
SC Kriens players
San Martín de San Juan footballers
Sportivo Luqueño players